Eilat, or Umm al-Rashrāsh, is Israel's southernmost city, with a population of , a busy port and popular resort at the northern tip of the Red Sea, on what is known in Israel as the Gulf of Eilat and in Jordan as the Gulf of Aqaba. The city is considered a tourist destination for domestic and international tourists heading to Israel.

Eilat is part of the Southern Negev Desert, at the southern end of the Arabah, adjacent to the Egyptian resort city of Taba to the south, the Jordanian port city of Aqaba to the east, and within sight of Haql, Saudi Arabia, across the gulf to the southeast.

Eilat's arid desert climate and low humidity are moderated by proximity to a warm sea. Eilat averages 360 sunny days a year.

Name

The name Eilat was given to Umm al-Rashrāsh in 1949 by the Committee for the Designation of Place-Names in the Negev. The name refers to Elath, a location mentioned in the Hebrew Bible that is thought to be located across the border in modern Jordan. The committee acknowledged that Biblical Eilat/Elath was across the border; one committee member, Yeshayahu Press, justified the co-opting of the name by stating "when the real Eilat finally is in our hands, our settlement will expand and reach over to there."

Geography

"The main elements that influenced the region's history were the copper resources and other minerals, the ancient international roads that crossed the area, and its geopolitical and strategic position. These resulted in a settlement density that defies the environmental conditions."

History

Early history
Archaeological excavations uncovered impressive prehistoric tombs dating to the 7th millennium BC at the western edge of Eilat, while nearby copper workings and mining operations at Timna Valley are the oldest on earth.

An Islamic copper smelting and trading community of 250–400 residents flourished in the area during the Umayyad Period (700–900 CE); its remains were found and excavated in 1989, at the northern edge of modern Eilat, between what is now the industrial zone and nearby Kibbutz Eilot.

Modern city
During the British Mandate era, a British police post existed in the area, which was known as Umm Al-Rashrash. The area was designated as part of the Jewish state in the 1947 UN Partition Plan. During the 1948 Arab-Israeli War, the abandoned police post, which consisted of five clay huts, was taken without a fight on March 10, 1949, as part of Operation Uvda. This marked the end of Israel's war for independence.

The town developed over the following years. Eilat Airport was built in 1949 and individual ships began arriving in the 1950s, but as there were no dedicated port facilities they unloaded their goods at sea. In the early 1950s, Eilat was a small and remote town, populated largely by port workers, soldiers, and former prisoners. The town's development accelerated in 1955, when it had a population of about 500. The Timna Copper Mines near the Timna Valley and the Port of Eilat were opened that year and concerted effort by the Israeli government to populate Eilat began, starting with Jewish immigrant families from Morocco being resettled there. Eilat began to develop rapidly after the Suez Crisis in 1956, with its tourism industry in particular starting to flourish. The Israeli Navy's Eilat naval base was founded that year. The town's population grew to 5,300 in 1961. Yoseftal Medical Center and the Eilat-Ashkelon pipeline were completed in 1968, and the population increased further, reaching 13,100 in 1972 and 18,900 in 1983.After the 1948 Arab–Israeli War Arab countries maintained a state of hostility with Israel, blocking all land routes; Israel's access to and trade with the rest of the world was by air and sea alone. Further, Egypt denied passage through the Suez Canal to Israeli-registered ships or to any ship carrying cargo to or from Israeli ports. This made Eilat and its sea port crucial to Israel's communications, commerce and trade with Africa and Asia, and for oil imports. Without recourse to a port on the Red Sea Israel would have been unable to develop its diplomatic, cultural and trade ties beyond the Mediterranean basin and Europe. This happened in 1956 and again in 1967, when Egypt's closure of the Straits of Tiran to Israeli shipping effectively blockaded the port of Eilat.
In 1956, this led to Israel's participation alongside Britain and France in the war against Egypt sparked by the Suez Crisis, while in 1967 90% of Israeli oil passed through the Straits of Tiran. Oil tankers that were due to pass through the straits were delayed. The straits' closure was cited by Israel as an additional casus belli leading to the outbreak of the Six-Day War. Following peace treaties signed with Egypt in 1979 and Jordan in 1994, Eilat's borders with its neighbors were finally opened.

Israeli–Arab conflict
Eilat is especially defended by its own special forces unit Lotar Eilat. It is a reservist special forces unit of the IDF trained in counter-terrorism and hostage rescue in the Eilat area, which has taken part in many counter-terrorist missions in the region since its formation in 1974. The Lotar unit is composed solely of reservists, citizens who must be Eilat residents between the ages of 20 and 60, who are on call in case of a terrorist attack on the city. It is one of only three units in the IDF authorized to free hostages on its own command. In 2007 the Eilat bakery bombing killed three civilian bakers. This was the first such attack in Eilat proper, although other terror attacks had been carried out in the area.

In 2011, terrorists infiltrated Israel across the Sinai border to execute multiple attacks on Highway 12, including a civilian bus and private car a few miles north of Eilat, in what became known as the 2011 southern Israel cross-border attacks.

In order to prevent terrorist infiltration of Israel from the Sinai, Israel has built the Egypt–Israel barrier, a steel barrier equipped with cameras, radar and motion sensors along the country's southern border. The fence was completed in January 2013.

Future development plans

In July 2012, Israel signed an agreement with China to cooperate in building the high-speed railway to Eilat, a railway line which will serve both passenger and freight trains. It will link Eilat with Beersheba and Tel Aviv, and will run through the Arava Valley and Nahal Zin.

The former Eilat Airport was closed on 18 March 2019 after the opening of Ramon Airport. The land occupied by the former airport is to be redeveloped. Hotels and apartment buildings, containing a total of 2,080 hotel rooms and 1,000 apartments will be constructed on the site, as well as 275 dunams of public space and pedestrian paths. The plans also set aside space for the railway line and an underground railway station. The plan's goal is to create an urban continuum between the city center and North Beach, as well as tighten the links between the city's neighborhoods, which were separated by the airport.

In addition, there are plans to move the Port of Eilat and the Eilat-Ashkelon pipeline terminal to the northern part of the city, as well as to turn it into a university town of science and research, and brand it an international sports city. All these projects are part of a plan to increase Eilat's population to 150,000 people and build 35,000 hotel rooms.

Climate
Eilat has a hot desert climate (BWh with hot, dry summers and warm and almost rainless winters  in Köppen climate classification). There are relatively small coral reefs near Eilat; however, 50 years ago they were much larger.

Demographics

The overwhelming majority of Eilat's population are Jews. Arabs constitute about 4% of the population.  Eilat's population includes a large number of foreign workers, estimated at over 10,000 working as caregivers, hotel workers and in the construction trades. Eilat also has a growing Israeli Arab population, as well as many affluent Jordanians and Egyptians who visit Eilat in the summer months.

In 2007, over 200 Sudanese refugees from Egypt who arrived in Israel illegally on foot were given work and allowed to stay in Eilat.

Education
The educational system of Eilat accommodates more than 9,000 youngsters in eight day-care centers, 67 pre-kindergartens and kindergartens, 10 elementary schools, and 3 six-year high schools. Also, there are some special-education schools and religious schools. Ben Gurion University of the Negev maintains a campus in Eilat. The Eilat branch has 1,100 students, about 75 percent from outside the city. In 2010, a new student dormitory was funded and built by the Jewish Federation of Toronto, the Rashi Foundation, Ben-Gurion University of the Negev and the municipality of Eilat. The SPNI's Eilat Field School on the outskirts of Eilat offers special hiking tours that focus on desert ecology, the Red Sea, bird migration and other aspects of Eilat's flora and fauna. The Hesder Yeshiva Ayelet Hashachar, is based in Eilat, established in 1997.

Healthcare
Yoseftal Medical Center, established in 1968, is Israel's southernmost hospital, and the only hospital covering the southern Negev. With 65 beds, the hospital is Israel's smallest. Special services geared to the Red Sea region are a hyperbaric chamber to treat victims of diving accidents and kidney dialysis facilities open to vacationing tourists.

Transportation

Air
Since 2019, Ramon International Airport has handled commercial domestic and international flights to Eilat (IATA: ETM, ICAO: LLER).

Former airports
 Eilat Airport is located in the city centre and was used largely for domestic flights (IATA: ETH, ICAO: LLET). The former site is to be redeveloped.
While no civilian flights use the airport any longer, it remains in use as a military airbase and for aircraft storage.

Road
Eilat has two main roads connecting it with the center of Israel - Route 12, which leads North West, and Route 90 which leads North East, and South West to the border crossing with Egypt.

Bus
Egged, the national bus company, provides regular service to points north on an almost hourly basis as well as in-city on a half-hourly basis during daylight hours. In part due to the comparatively long travel times, there are different booking procedures for buses to Eilat, including the option of advance reservations.

Border crossings with Egypt and Jordan
 The Taba Border Crossing allows crossing to and from Taba, Egypt.
 The Wadi Araba Crossing, renamed the Yitzhak Rabin Border Crossing on the Israeli side, allows crossing to and from Aqaba, Jordan.

Maritime
The Port of Eilat and Eilat Marina allow travel by sea.

Rail
Future plans also call for a rail link, sometimes referred to as the Med-Red to decrease travel times substantially from Eilat to Tel Aviv and Jerusalem, via the existing line at Beer Sheba; planning is underway. As of 2021 Dimona railway station is the southernmost passenger train station in Israel.

Economy
In the 1970s tourism became increasingly important to the city's economy as other industries shut down or were drastically reduced. Today tourism is the city's major source of income, although Eilat became a free trade zone in 1985.

Tourism

Eilat offers a wide range of accommodations, from hostels and luxury hotels to Bedouin hospitality. In recent years Eilat has been the target of militants from Egypt and Gaza causing a reduced tourist inflow to the region. Attractions include:

Birdwatching and ringing station: Eilat is located on the main migration route between Africa and Europe. International Birding & Research Center in Eilat.
Camel tours
Coral Beach Nature Reserve, an underwater marine reserve of tropical marine flora and fauna
Coral World Underwater Observatory, located at the southern tip of Coral Beach, it has aquaria, a museum, simulation rides, and shark, turtle, and stingray tanks. The observatory is the biggest public aquarium in the Middle East.
Dolphin Reef, a marine biology and research station where visitors can swim and interact with dolphins
Freefall parachuting.
Yotvata Hai-Bar Nature Reserve, established in the 1960s to conserve endangered species, including Biblical animals, from this and similar regions. The reserve has a visitors' center, care and treatment enclosures, and large open area where desert animals are acclimated before re-introduction into the wild. Hai-Bar efforts have successfully re-introduced the Asian wild ass, or onager, into the Negev. The Hai-Bar Nature Reserve and animal re-introduction program were described in Bill Clark's book "High Hills and Wild Goats: Life Among the Animals of the Hai-Bar Wildlife Refuge". The book also describes life in Eilat and the surrounding area.
Marina, with some 250 yacht berths
Timna Valley Park, the oldest copper mines in the world; Egyptian temple of Hathor, King Solomon's Pillars sandstone formation, ancient pit mines and rock art
"What's Up", a portable astronomical observatory with programs in the desert and on the promenade
Ice Mall, ice skating rink and shopping mall

Dive tourism

Skin and scuba diving equipment is for hire on or near all major beaches. Scuba diving equipment rental and compressed air are available from diving clubs and schools all year round. Eilat is located in the Gulf of Aqaba, one of the most popular diving destinations in the world. The coral reefs along Eilat's coast remain relatively pristine and the area is recognized as one of the prime diving locations in the world. About 250,000 dives are performed annually in Eilat's  coastline, and diving represents 10% of the tourism income of this area. In addition, given the proximity of many of these reefs to the shore, non-divers can encounter the Red Sea's reefs with relative ease.

Museums 
 Eilat City Museum
 Eilat Art Gallery

Film
Eilat has been utilized by film and television productions - domestic and foreign - for location shooting since the 1960s, most notably in the early 90s as a tropical locale for season 2 of the Canadian production Tropical Heat.

It was also used in the films She, Madron, Ashanti and Rambo III.

Archaeology
Despite harsh conditions, the region has supported large populations as far back as 8,000 BCE.

Exploration of ancient sites began in 1861, but only 7% of the area has undergone serious archaeological excavation. Some 1,500 ancient sites are located in a  area. In contrast to the gaps found in settlement periods in the neighbouring Negev Highlands and Sinai, these sites show continuous settlement for the past 10,000 years.

Notable people

 Shawn Dawson (born 1993), basketball player
 Gadi Eizenkot (born 1960), Chief of General Staff of the Israel Defense Forces
 Eden Harel (born 1976), actress
 Amit Ivry (born 1989), Olympic swimmer and national record holder
 Keren Karolina Avratz (born 1971), singer, songwriter
 Shaul Mofaz (born 1948), former Minister of Defense, former Chief of General Staff of the Israel Defense Forces
 Ziki Shaked (born 1955), first Israeli ship's captain to go around the world under the Israeli flag, from Eilat to Eilat
 Shahar Tzuberi (born 1986), Israeli Olympic bronze-medal-winning windsurfer, 2008 Olympic Games in Beijing
 Raviv Ullman (born 1986), Israeli-American actor, musician
 Ghil'ad Zuckermann (born 1971), linguist, with a focus on language revitalization

Twin towns – sister cities

Eilat is twinned with:

 Acapulco, Mexico
 Antibes, France
 Arica, Chile
 Durban, South Africa
 Kamen, Germany
 Kampen, Netherlands
 Karlovy Vary, Czech Republic
 Los Angeles, United States
 Palanga, Lithuania
 Piešťany, Slovakia

 Sopron, Hungary
 Sorrento, Italy
 Yalta, Ukraine
 Yinchuan, China
 Ushuaia, Argentina 

Eilat has streets named after Antibes, Durban, Kamen, Kampen and Los Angeles as well as a Canada Park.

Panoramic views

See also
 Bnei Eilat F.C.
 Eilat Pride
 Eilat Sports Center
 Eilat stone
 Hapoel Eilat B.C.
 Operation Ovda
 Red Sea Jazz Festival
 Yotvata Airfield

References

External links

 Eilat + official tourism website of the city of Eilat
 Official city site 
 Crossing the Israel – Jordan Border
 Eilat Tourist directory
 A film about Eilat in 1960 commentary 
 Photos of Eilat
 Tourism city guide site
 Eilat Today, a magazine of current affairs
 Birding in Eilat
 Scuba Diving in Eilat with descriptions of dive sites

 
1951 establishments in Israel
Cities in Southern District (Israel)
Hebrew Bible cities
Populated places established in 1951
Port cities and towns of the Red Sea
Port cities in Israel
Spa towns in Israel